is a 1957 Japanese film directed by Ishirō Honda.

The production company being Toho Co, Ltd have also distributed another film called 'A Farewell to the Woman Called My Sister' - which was also released at the same time as 'A Teapicker's Song of Goodbye'. This movie was also a black and white film.

References

1957 films
Japanese drama films
Films directed by Ishirō Honda
1950s Japanese films